Anissa Blondin (born 25 November 1992) is a Belgian model and Beauty pageant titleholder who placed 1st runner up in Miss Belgium 2014. She competed at Miss World 2014 and Miss Universe 2014.

Early life
She was born to a Belgian (Flemish) father and a Moroccan-Algerian mother. Blondin hails from Dworp. Her hobbies are dancing, skiing and cooking.

Pageantry

Miss Belgium 2014
Anissa was 1st runner up in Miss Belgie 2014 and represented Flemish Brabant. She is going to both pageants to represent Belgium.

Miss World 2014
Anissa competed at Miss World 2014 in London but was not placed.

Miss Universe 2014
Anissa participated in Miss Universe 2014, held in Doral, Florida, USA, but failed to advance to the Top 15.

References

External links
 Miss België, Miss Belgique, Miss Belgien

1992 births
Living people
Miss Universe 2014 contestants
Models from Brussels
Belgian people of Algerian descent
Belgian people of Moroccan descent
Miss World 2014 delegates
Belgian beauty pageant winners